Clarinda Community School District is a rural public school district headquartered in Clarinda, Iowa, United States. The district, in sections of Page and Taylor counties, serves Clarinda, Hepburn, Yorktown, and sections of New Market.

History
On July 1, 2008, the New Market Community School District was dissolved; portions went to the Clarinda district.

Schools
 Clarinda Junior/Senior High school 
 Garfield Elementary School

Clarinda High School

Athletics
The Cardinals compete in the Hawkeye 10 Conference in the following sports:

Fall Sports
Football
Cross Country (boys and girls)
Boys' - 3-time State Champions (1956, 1962, 1963)
Volleyball

Winter Sports
Basketball (boys and girls)
Bowling
Wrestling
 1994 Class 2A State Champions

Spring Sports
Golf (boys and girls)
 Girls' - 1999 Class 2A State Champions
Tennis (boys and girls)
Track and Field (boys and girls)
 Boys' - 1956 Class A State Champions

Summer Sports
Baseball
Softball

See also
List of school districts in Iowa
List of high schools in Iowa

References

External links
 Clarinda Community School District

School districts in Iowa
Education in Page County, Iowa
Education in Taylor County, Iowa